Mitchell Mammary is a Lebanon international rugby league footballer who plays as a  for the Wentworthville Magpies. He was selected to represent Lebanon in the 2017 Rugby League World Cup.

References

External links
2017 RLWC profile

Living people
Australian people of Lebanese descent
Australian rugby league players
Mammary
Rugby league props
Wentworthville Magpies players
Year of birth missing (living people)